Fernand Lalonde (born August 27, 1932) is a Canadian lawyer and politician. Lalonde represented the riding of Marguerite-Bourgeoys in the National Assembly of Quebec from 1973 to 1984.

Born in Mont-Laurier, Quebec, Lalonde is the son of Maurice Lalonde and Éléonore Côté. He was educated at the Séminaire de Mont-Laurier, the Séminaire de Saint-Jean-d'Iberville, the Collège Sainte-Marie de Montréal, the Université de Montréal and McGill University. He was called to the Quebec bar in 1957 and practised law in Montreal. In 1974, he was named Queen's Counsel.

He was the coordinator of the Yes campaign in the Charlottetown Accord referendum of 1992.

References 
 

1932 births
Living people
People from Mont-Laurier
Quebec Liberal Party MNAs
Canadian King's Counsel
McGill University alumni